Sphingnotus dunningi is a species of beetle in the family Cerambycidae. It was described by Francis Polkinghorne Pascoe in 1867. It is known from Moluccas.

Subspecies
 Sphingnotus dunningi gazellus Gressitt, 1984
 Sphingnotus dunningi dunningi Pascoe, 1867
 Sphingnotus dunningi costipennis Breuning, 1950
 Sphingnotus dunningi regius Kriesche, 1928

References

Tmesisternini
Beetles described in 1867